The Mongenast Ministry was only in office in Luxembourg for 25 days, from 12 October to 6 November 1915.

Composition
 Mathias Mongenast: Director-General of Finances, acting President of the Council
 Victor Thorn: Director-General for Justice and Public Works
 Ernest Leclère: Director-General for the Interior

References

Ministries of Luxembourg
Luxembourg in World War I